Tour de Bretagne Cycliste, also known as the Tour de Bretagne trophée des granitiers and formerly known as Ruban Granitier Breton, is an annual early season professional cycling stage race held in late April and early May in Brittany, France. The race often acts as a show case for upcoming riders of the under 23 category who race together with Elite riders. The race was renamed Tour de Bretagne in 2005 when the race also became a professional race.

The 2007 edition was dominated by Lars Boom and Edvald Boasson Hagen who both wore the leader's jersey and won stages of the race.

The 2008 edition was dominated by the Rabobank team with defending champion Lars Boom and Coen Vermeltfoort winning two stages each. The Bretagne Armor Lux won the general classification with Benoît Poilvet.

The 2010 edition started in Jersey – the first time stages of the race had been held outside Brittany.

Past winners

References

External links 

Cycle races in France
Recurring sporting events established in 1967
1967 establishments in France
UCI Europe Tour races